Bowen Air Lines was an airline that operated from  until . Founded in Fort Worth, Texas, by Temple Bowen, it flew passengers and express packages to select destinations between Chicago, Illinois, and Brownsville, Texas. Starting initially with a fleet of five Lockheed Vega aircraft, the airline additionally acquired a Lockheed Sirius, two Lockheed Model 9 Orion aircraft (including the prototype), and two Vultee V-1 aircraft. Despite having flown over 4,000,000 miles and having carried 45,000 passengers, the company ceased operations on  due to its inability to procure an airmail contract from the United States Post Office Department. With the exception of the Vultee aircraft that were sold to American Airlines, the rest of the company's assets were purchased by Braniff Airways.

References

Further reading 
 

Defunct airlines of the United States